Disintegrin and metalloproteinase domain-containing protein 11 is an enzyme that in humans is encoded by the ADAM11 gene.

This gene encodes a member of the ADAM (a disintegrin and metalloprotease) protein family. Members of this family are membrane-anchored proteins structurally related to snake venom disintegrins, and have been implicated in a variety of biological processes involving cell-cell and cell-matrix interactions, including fertilization, muscle development, and neurogenesis. This gene represents a candidate tumor suppressor gene for human breast cancer based on its location within a minimal region of chromosome 17q21 previously defined by tumor deletion mapping.

References

Further reading

External links
 The MEROPS online database for peptidases and their inhibitors: M12.976
 

Proteases
Human proteins
EC 3.4.24